The Ixworth is an English breed of white domestic chicken. It is named for the village of Ixworth in Suffolk, where it was created in 1932. It was bred as fast-growing high-quality meat breed with reasonable laying abilities.

History 

The Ixworth was created in 1932 by Reginald Appleyard, who also created the Silver Appleyard Duck, at his poultry farm in the village of Ixworth in Suffolk. It was bred from white Sussex,  white Minorca, white Orpington, Jubilee, Indian Game and white Indian Game chickens, with the intention of creating a dual purpose breed, a fast-growing high-quality meat bird with reasonable egg-laying ability. An Ixworth bantam was created in 1938; Appleyard thought it better than the standard-sized bird.

In the 1970s the Ixworth almost disappeared; it has since gradually recovered. It is a rare breed: in 2007 it was listed by the FAO as "endangered-maintained". In 2008 it was listed as "Category 2: endangered" by the Rare Breeds Survival Trust, and in 2014 was on the Trust's list of native poultry breeds at risk.

Characteristics 

The plumage of the Ixworth is pure white. The comb is of pea type; it and the face, earlobes and wattles are brilliant red. The eyes are bright orange or red. The beak, shanks, feet, skin and flesh are all white.

The meat commands premium prices.

References

Chicken breeds
Chicken breeds originating in the United Kingdom
Animal breeds on the RBST Watchlist
Ixworth